The ruins of Kirkham Priory are situated on the banks of the River Derwent, at Kirkham, North Yorkshire, England. The Augustinian priory was founded in the 1120s by Walter l'Espec, lord of nearby Helmsley, who also built Rievaulx Abbey. The priory was surrendered in 8 December 1539 during the Dissolution of the Monasteries. Legend has it that Kirkham was founded in remembrance of l'Espec's only son who had died nearby as a consequence of his horse being startled by a boar.
The area was later used to test the D-Day landing vehicles, and was visited by Winston Churchill. The ruins are now Grade I listed and a scheduled monument in the care of English Heritage.

Gatehouse ruins

The Gatehouse of Kirkham Priory, built , is a specimen of English Gothic medieval architecture. It is a rare survival of such a gatehouse, comparable to that of Butley Priory in Suffolk. It has a wide arch of continuous mouldings with a crocketed gable running up to the windows, with  sculptures of St George and the Dragon on the left, and David and Goliath to the right. Above the arch is Christ in a pointed oval recess, plus two figures below of St Bartholomew and St Philip, in niches. There are also many escutcheons with the armorials of the various benefactors of the Priory, including the arms of de Ros, Scrope, de Forz, Vaux, FitzRalph & Espec (3 cart-wheels, each with 6 spokes).

 Arms of Scrope: Azure, a bend or
 Arms of de Forz
 Arms of de Clare
 Arms of de Ros

Burials
Sir William de Ros (b. before 1200 – d. ca. 1264/1265), father of Robert de Ros, 1st Baron de Ros.
Robert de Ros (died 1285)
William de Ros, 1st Baron de Ros
William de Ros, 2nd Baron de Ros
Ralph Greystoke, 5th Baron Greystoke

Preparation for D-Day landings in the Second World War

During the Second World War, the priory was used by the military in training for what became the largest seaborne invasion in history, the D-Day landings which took place on 6 June 1944. Amongst units moved to Kirkham were the British 11th armoured division, the aim being to give drivers experience of manoeuvring and to test various waterproofing compounds and to gain experience with equipment to be used in the landings. Tanks, jeeps and other military vehicles destined for the landings were put through their paces at the priory and on the banks of the River Derwent. Troops made use of the high wall of the Western Cloister in training with scrambling nets, which they would subsequently use to make their way from the main transport ships into the smaller landing craft during the invasion. Prime Minister Winston Churchill and King George VI visited the priory in secret to monitor preparations, an indication of Kirkham's significance as a training ground.

Further reading

English Heritage Listed Buildings text

References

External links

 Kirkham priory
 Priory Portal
 Visitor information: English Heritage
 

Monasteries in North Yorkshire
Churches in North Yorkshire
English Heritage sites in North Yorkshire
Ruins in North Yorkshire
1120s establishments in England
Religious organizations established in the 1120s
Grade I listed churches in North Yorkshire
Christian monasteries established in the 12th century
Augustinian monasteries in England
Grade I listed monasteries
Grade I listed ruins
Church ruins in England